Psychology of Addictive Behaviors is a peer-reviewed academic journal of the American Psychological Association that publishes original articles related to the psychological aspects of addictive behaviors 8 times a year. The current editor-in-chief is Tammy Chung (University of Pittsburgh).

The journal has implemented the Transparency and Openness Promotion (TOP) Guidelines.  The TOP Guidelines provide structure to research planning and reporting and aim to make research more transparent, accessible, and reproducible. 

The journal includes articles on the following topics:

alcohol and alcoholism
drug use and abuse
eating disorders
smoking and nicotine addiction, and
other excessive behaviors (e.g., gambling, sexual addiction)

Abstracting and indexing 
The journal is abstracted and indexed by MEDLINE/PubMed and the Social Sciences Citation Index. According to the Journal Citation Reports, the journal has a 2020 impact factor of 3.288.

References

External links
 Journal Description

Addiction medicine journals
Abnormal psychology journals
American Psychological Association academic journals